The following is a list of ecoregions in Spain, including the Canary Islands, Ceuta, Melilla, and the Plazas de soberanía, according to the Worldwide Fund for Nature (WWF).

Terrestrial ecoregions

Mediterranean forests, woodlands, and scrub
 Canary Islands dry woodlands and forests (Canary Islands)
 Iberian conifer forests
 Iberian sclerophyllous and semi-deciduous forests
 Mediterranean acacia-argania dry woodlands and succulent thickets (Canary Islands)
 Mediterranean woodlands and forests (Ceuta, Melilla, and Plazas de soberanía)
 Northeastern Spain and Southern France Mediterranean forests
 Northwest Iberian montane forests
 Southeastern Iberian shrubs and woodlands
 Southwest Iberian Mediterranean sclerophyllous and mixed forests

Temperate broadleaf and mixed forests
 Cantabrian mixed forests
 Pyrenees conifer and mixed forests

Freshwater ecoregions
 Atlantic Northwest Africa (Ceuta, Melilla, and Plazas de soberanía)
 Cantabric Coast - Languedoc
 Eastern Iberia
 Southern Iberia
 Western Iberia

Marine ecoregions
 Alboran Sea
 Azores Canaries Madeira
 South European Atlantic
 Western Mediterranean

References
 Spalding, Mark D., Helen E. Fox, Gerald R. Allen, Nick Davidson et al. "Marine Ecoregions of the World: A Bioregionalization of Coastal and Shelf Areas". Bioscience Vol. 57 No. 7, July/August 2007, pp. 573-583.
 Thieme, Michelle L. (2005). Freshwater Ecoregions of Africa and Madagascar: A Conservation Assessment. Island Press, Washington DC.

 
Spain
Ecoregions